Benji Nzeakor (born 16 April 1964) is a retired Nigerian football forward.

Nzeakor began playing club football in Nigeria, spending time with Sharks F.C., Stationery Stores F.C. and National. In 1988, he moved to Brazil where he played for Esporte Clube Vitória in the Campeonato Brasileiro. He became the first African footballer to play in Peru, joining Deportivo Municipal in 1992. He stayed just one season after suffering a knee injury.

Nzeakor made several appearances for the Nigeria national football team in the 1980s, including two FIFA World Cup qualifying matches.

He retired from playing football in 1996, and went on to become a FIFA-licensed players' agent based in Brazil.

References

1964 births
Living people
Nigerian footballers
Nigeria international footballers
Esporte Clube Vitória players
America Football Club (RJ) players
Deportivo Municipal footballers
Expatriate footballers in Brazil
Nigerian expatriates in Brazil
Sharks F.C. players
Sportspeople from Port Harcourt
Association football forwards